Faxonius hathawayi blacki, the Calcasieu crayfish, is a sub-species of crayfish in the family Cambaridae. It is endemic to Louisiana. The common name refers to the Calcasieu River, near where the original specimens were found in Beauregard Parish, Louisiana.

References

External links

Cambaridae
Endemic fauna of Louisiana
Freshwater crustaceans of North America
Crustaceans described in 1972
Taxobox trinomials not recognized by IUCN